Bourlon is a commune in the Pas-de-Calais department in the Hauts-de-France region in northern France.

Geography
A farming village located 22 miles (35 km) southeast of Arras on the D16 road, just yards from the A26 autoroute.

Population

Sights
 The Canadian Bourlon Wood Memorial war memorial.
 The church of St. Martin, dating from the eighteenth century.
 Two 20th century chapels.
 The Commonwealth War Graves Commission cemetery.

See also
 Communes of the Pas-de-Calais department

References

External links

 Official commune website
 Bourlon Wood cemetery

Communes of Pas-de-Calais